David Lee Darland (born September 4, 1966) is an American auto racing driver from Kokomo, Indiana. He was the 1997 USAC Silver Crown Champion, 1999 USAC National Sprint Car Champion, and 2001 and 2002 USAC National Midget Champion, making him the third driver to claim all three USAC National Championships. He is nicknamed "The People's Champ".

Background
Darland was born and raised in Lincoln, Indiana. His father was a steelworker and his mother was a housewife.

Racing career
Darland began racing quarter midgets when he was four years old. His father Bob Darland helped build his first sprint car when he was 16 years old. Darland's first sprint car win happened at Kokomo Speedway when he beat Steve Kinser's father Bob in 1986. Darland won over 100 features in his own sprint car.

Darland's first USAC feature win came in 1993 when he was 26 years old. Darland won the 2001 and 2002 USAC National Midget championships.  Race wins include the 2007 & 2013 Turkey Night Grand Prix, a Southern California traditional race held on Thanksgiving Day for many years, and three wins at the Oval Nationals, held at Perris Auto Speedway in Perris, California.

As of July 25, 2020, his 20 Indiana Sprint Week race wins are the most in the series history (since 1988). As of September 26, 2020, he is the winningest driver in USAC Sprint Car history. Darland took over as the winningest USAC overall driver (in either midgets, sprint cars, and Silver Crown cars) when he passed Tom Bigelow's 52 total wins in 2014.

Personal life
Darland and his wife Brenda have three children. He suffered a mild stroke on April 23, 2021 and was hospitalized with some confusion.

Awards 
2017 National Sprint Car Hall of Fame inductee
2015 Thomas J. Schmeh Award for Outstanding Contribution to the Sport
2015  Mike Curb Super License Award
2011 Won the King of Indiana Sprint Series title
2008 Won The Bob Darland Memorial Race in honor of his father.
2007 Indiana Sprintweek Champion
2002 USAC National Midget Series Champion
2001 USAC National Midget Series Champion
2001 Indiana Sprintweek Champion
1999 USAC National Sprint Car Series Champion
1999 HARF "Driver of the Year"
1997 USAC Silver Crown Series Champion
1997 HARF Co-"Driver of the Year" with Tony Stewart
1995 USAC Silver Crown Series "Most Improved Driver"
1994 HARF "Driver of the Year"

References

External links

Official website

1966 births
Living people
Sportspeople from Kokomo, Indiana
Racing drivers from Indiana
USAC Silver Crown Series drivers